A Post Office sorting van is a type of rail vehicle built for use in a Travelling Post Office.

British Rail built ninety-six of these vehicles between 1959 and 1977, to several similar designs, all based on the Mark 1 coach design. They were numbered in the range 80300–80395. The earliest vehicles built featured catching nets and collection arms, to allow mail bags to be exchanged without the train needing to stop, a practice which continued until 1971. Following the Great Train Robbery, vehicles from 80319 onwards featured a revised design with smaller windows.

In the early 1970s, British Rail introduced the TOPS classification system. Vehicles were given the TOPS code NS, followed by an A if they were air-braked, V if vacuum-braked, or an X if they had both air and vacuum brakes.

Preservation 
Several sorting vehicles have been preserved, including examples from most of the big four companies, as well as some from even earlier. There are also several BR Mark 1 vehicles in preservation, including the first-built vehicle, no. 80300; the last vehicle built with large windows, no. 80318; and the final vehicle overhauled by EWS, no. 80382. The complete list is shown below:

British Rail Mk1 TPO sorting vehicles:

Pre-nationalisation design TPO sorting vehicles:

Pre-grouping TPO sorting vehicles:

External links 
 Rail Vehicle Preservation - owners of preserved vehicle 80301

British Rail coaching stock